Paisley South was a parliamentary constituency centred on the town of Paisley in Renfrewshire, Scotland.  It returned one Member of Parliament (MP) to the House of Commons of the Parliament of the United Kingdom, elected by the first past the post system.

History 

The constituency was created when the former Paisley constituency was divided for the 1983 general election.  It was abolished for the 2005 general election, when Paisley was represented by the new constituencies of Paisley & Renfrewshire South and Paisley & Renfrewshire North.

Boundaries 
The Renfrew District electoral divisions of Johnstone, Paisley Central, and Paisley Gleniffer.

Members of Parliament

Election results

Elections of the 1980s

Elections of the 1990s

Elections of the 2000s

References

Historic parliamentary constituencies in Scotland (Westminster)
Constituencies of the Parliament of the United Kingdom established in 1983
Constituencies of the Parliament of the United Kingdom disestablished in 2005
Politics of Paisley, Renfrewshire